Podezření (English: Suspicion) is 2022 Czech-French drama television series by Czech Television. Before its broadcast, it was shown at Karlovy Vary International Film Festival.

Plot
Hardworking and cold Nurse Hana Kučerová is suspected of murdering her patient. Her co-workers point to her as the natural suspect acting from their own motivations and prejudices.

Cast
Klára Melíšková as nurse Hana Kučerová
Denisa Barešová as Hana's daughter Tereza
Miroslav Hanuš as defense attorney Novák
Ivan Trojan as Dalibor Vaculík
Elizaveta Maximová as Larisa Klimenková
Marek Pospíchal as detective Berka
Petr Lněnička as hospital director Karel Kříž
Milena Steinmasslová as chief nurse Jarošová

Episodes

References

External links 
Official site
IMDB site

Czech drama television series
Czech legal television series
2022 Czech television series debuts
French drama television series
2022 French television series debuts
Czech Television original programming
Czech television miniseries
Czech Lion Awards winners (television series)